Equestrian use of roadways was historically popular, and continues to be popular in many parts of the world. It is subject to a wide variety of regulatory law.

Horses on the roadways 
The use of horses for transportation, either by horseback riding or by using them to pull buggies and carriages on roads, was common before the advent of automobiles. It was the primary form of transportation until automobiles took over in the late 19th century. However, horses are still used for transport and recreational purposes in certain parts of the world. In the USA, such as Pennsylvania and Ohio, where certain sects such as the Amish reside, they are much more common.

Safety precautions 
The roadways in the United States of America are able to be ridden using horses. According to the State of both Ohio and Pennsylvania, in which a section of each state has an Amish or Mennonite sect, approximately sixty major crashes involving horses and buggies occur yearly, over the course of a decade. This means that over the course of ten years, approximately six hundred accidents occur that involves horses. These accidents are more common in places such as Ohio and Pennsylvania because of the Amish culture. There are some safety precautions, however, you can make in order to attempt to prevent these types of accidents from occurring. Displaying some form of a fluorescent light or reflective clothing can help other motorists on the road see you more easily (if you are a horseback rider). Riding a horse is best done during daylight and in fair weather. Avoiding riding a horse on roadways in icy, snowy or foggy conditions can decrease the chances of an accident. If your horse is unfamiliar with riding on roads, avoiding roads all together is a safe practice. Horses can be spooked fairly easily, and to minimize your horse becoming panicked, avoiding a busy roadway is a good safety precaution to take. However, if it is necessary to ride on the roadway or cross a roadway, asking someone to accompany you that may be more experienced can be helpful. Riding single file, as well as crossing major roadways in a group increases your visibility for oncoming motorists. Although horses are rather large animals, from a far distance it is easier to see a number of horses rather than just one. For motorists, to increase an equestrians’ safety on the road, be prepared to stop. It is important to not sound your horn or rev your engine while you are near or passing a horse. Although they may be slow moving, patience is important to make sure both the rider and the horse remain safe. Make sure to pass someone who is riding a horse widely. For experienced riders, it is also important to have your horse walk, rather than go in a faster gate on roadways that are hard, such as asphalt. Faster gaits lead to a higher likelihood of your horse falling with you on it due to the hardness of the surface.

Leisure equestrians 
The equine industry is best known for its pricey thoroughbred fillies and stallions and the races that we see on television, such as the well-known Kentucky Derby. About 4.6 million Americans are involved in someway, shape or form with horses. There are many different ways in being a part of the equine community. Wranglers, ranchers, parents and more are all part of this community.  Many people use horses in a variety of shows and races in order to win awards, including jumping, endurance races, and horsemanship and western pleasure. Horses can also be used in an occupation, such as ranching or wrangling. Approximately 6.9 million horses are owned by citizens throughout the United States of America in total. There is a four to one ratio with the number of horses that are in the country to people who own horses that are in the United States of America. In a recent survey performed by The American Horse Council, an estimated four million horses are used in recreational use, three million for showing, one hundred thousand for racing and two million for other forms of utilization. Ultimately, horses are primarily used leisurely and recreationally now. Horses have become not exactly a necessity to many people, but rather a favorite past time, and a hobby that can be life-long. However, there are, of course, people who use horses as livestock and a major mode of transportation, which makes this luxury to some, and a necessity to others.

Horses - a necessity to some 

Throughout history, transportation using a horse and buggy has developed into a more modern realm, eventually becoming today's automobile. However, in certain areas of Ohio and Pennsylvania, horse and buggy is a main form of transportation. The Amish, Mennonite and the Brethren community can be dated back to as early as the sixteenth century. In the eighteen hundreds, members of their conservative Christian faith fled Europe and began a new life in a small county in Pennsylvania called Lancaster. They are best known for their simple life styles, including having limited forms of electricity, living off the land and having very modest and conservative viewpoints on a number of topics. Many families have adapted to the modern age and now allow some forms of technology, as long as it does not interrupt or affect family time. Amish are forbidden to own cars, but are allowed to ride in them when needed. That is why the Amish, Mennonite and Brethren population use horse and buggy for their main mode of transportation. In many states throughout the United States of America, an orange triangle that symbolizes ‘a slow moving vehicle’ must be fastened on the back of the carriage part of the buggy. When this symbol is in use, it means that the vehicle is prohibited or unable to move faster than twenty-five miles per hour. Unfortunately, the majority of accidents involving horses involve high-speed automobiles. Nonetheless, when approaching a horse-drawn carriage or someone riding a horse, remember that horses are an animal and can be unpredictable at times. Although some horses are relatively comfortable and used to being around motor vehicles, loud cars and horns can still spook horses easily. It is also important to slow down and give plenty of room to pass the horse and buggy legally and safely. If you were to visit the county of Lancaster today, you would see that almost all Amish, Mennonite and Brethren families own some form of transportation, typically horses and a buggy.

Horses have rights when it comes to being on the road, similar to cyclists and runners who utilize the roadways. However, there are specific rules and regulations that they must abide. Horseback riders must ride with traffic, as far to the right as possible on the roadway. However, many equestrians believe that riding against traffic is a safer way to use the roadway with a horse. Horses do best when they can see what is coming towards them, rather than guessing what is coming towards them from behind. Although this is not the same in each state in the United States of America, the vast majority follow this rule. From state to state, some statues and regulations vary. For example, the state of New York has a very set comprehensive list of rules for the use of horses on the road- both being ridden upon and being horse-driven vehicles. The state of Louisiana prohibits the riding of a horse on any asphalt-based road. There are many states that prohibit the driving or riding of horses on the right of way on a limited-access highway like an interstate highway. Many the regulations are similar. They include only passing the horse-driven vehicle or horseback rider when it is safe to do so and prohibiting the use of any form of noise, such as a horn. In order to minimize the number of accidents that occur with horse and road distractions, people who are actively driving should try to be as cautious as possible to try to avoid these situations.

See also
Bridle path
Pedestrian crossing
Trails

References

Equestrianism
Road transport
Horse trails